Polo at the Pan American Games was only held at the 1951 Pan American Games in Buenos Aires, Argentina.

Medal table

Medalists

References

  .

 
Polo
Polo at multi-sport events